Mount Fernie is a  mountain, and is directly northwest of the town of Fernie, British Columbia. It offers an excellent hiking trail for those that can handle steep and challenging ridges. Mount Fernie Provincial Park is adjacent to the Mountain.

References

Elk Valley (British Columbia)
Fernie
Regional District of East Kootenay
Fernie
Kootenay Land District